Karim El Mourabet (born 30 April 1987 in Orléans) is a football defender. He currently plays for Olympic Club de Safi.

El Mourabet made his France U-21 team debut against Sweden U-21 team, on November 14, 2006. He was called up to the Morocco national football team in 2007 for a match against Ghana.

References

External links
 
 FCNA.fr 
 

1987 births
Living people
Moroccan footballers
Morocco international footballers
French footballers
French sportspeople of Moroccan descent
France youth international footballers
France under-21 international footballers
US Orléans players
FC Déolois players
FC Nantes players
Stade Lavallois players
Ligue 1 players
Ligue 2 players
Association football defenders
Footballers from Orléans
Fath Union Sport players
Olympic Club de Safi players